Marta Larralde (born 22 April 1981) is a Spanish actress from Galicia. She is known for her performances in series such as Gran Hotel or Seis hermanas.

Biography 
Born on 22 April 1981 in Vigo, Larralde took studies in Image and Sound in her native city before becoming a professional actress. She was also a member of the track and field section of Celta de Vigo. Larralde worked as assistant director for Fernando León de Aranoa in Mondays in the Sun (2002). 

She made her feature film debut as an actress with a leading role in Gonzalo Tapia's Lena, released in 2001. In 2004, she starred in León and Olvido. More than 15 years later, she reprised the role of Olvido in Olvido and León, the sequel to León and Olvido.

Filmography 

Television

Film

Awards and nominations

References 

1981 births
Living people
Actresses from Galicia (Spain)
21st-century Spanish actresses
Spanish film actresses
Spanish television actresses